Men's 100m races for blind & visually impaired athletes at the 2004 Summer Paralympics were held in the Athens Olympic Stadium. Events were held in three disability classes.

T11

The T11 event consisted of 6 heats, 3 semifinals and A & B finals. It was won by José Armando Sayovo, representing .

1st Round

Heat 1
21 Sept. 2004, 10:35

Heat 2
21 Sept. 2004, 10:41

Heat 3
21 Sept. 2004, 10:47

Heat 4
21 Sept. 2004, 10:53

Heat 5
21 Sept. 2004, 10:59

Heat 6
21 Sept. 2004, 11:05

Semifinals
Heat 1
21 Sept. 2004, 20:25

Heat 2
21 Sept. 2004, 20:31

Heat 3
21 Sept. 2004, 20:37

Final Round
Final A
22 Sept. 2004, 17:40

Final B
22 Sept. 2004, 17:30

T12

The T12 event consisted of 8 heats, 3 semifinals and A & B finals. It was won by Adekundo Adesoji, representing .

1st Round

Heat 1
21 Sept. 2004, 11:15

Heat 2
21 Sept. 2004, 11:21

Heat 3
21 Sept. 2004, 11:27

Heat 4
21 Sept. 2004, 11:33

Heat 5
21 Sept. 2004, 11:39

Heat 6
21 Sept. 2004, 11:45

Heat 7
21 Sept. 2004, 11:51

Heat 8
21 Sept. 2004, 11:57

Semifinals
Heat 1
21 Sept. 2004, 19:40

Heat 2
21 Sept. 2004, 19:46

Heat 3
21 Sept. 2004, 19:52

Final Round
Final A
22 Sept. 2004, 17:20

Final B
22 Sept. 2004, 17:10

T13

The T13 event consisted of 2 heats and a final. It was won by Royal Mitchell, representing .

1st Round

Heat 1
26 Sept. 2004, 22:10

Heat 2
26 Sept. 2004, 22:16

Final Round
27 Sept. 2004, 17:05

References

M